Bacon County High School is located in the town of Alma in Bacon County, Georgia, United States. It is part of the Bacon County School District.

Demographics
The demographic breakdown of the 613 students enrolled for the 2020-21 school year was:
Girls - 46.2%
Boys - 53.8%
Asian - 0.5%
Black - 19.9%
Hispanic -13.6%
White - 63.6%
Multiracial - 2.4%

Athletics and Activities 
The Bacon County Red Raiders offer the following sports and activities:

 Baseball 
 Basketball 
 Cheerleading 
 Wrestling
 Soccer
 Bass Fishing
 Cross country 
 Football
 Golf 
 Softball
 Tennis 
 Track
 Drama
 BETA
 E-Sports
 FCCLA
 HOSA
 FCA
 CTAE
 Marching Band

Championships
 Baseball - 2004 AA State Champions

Notable alumni
Harry Crews, novelist, playwright, short story writer and essayist

References

External links 
 

Public high schools in Georgia (U.S. state)
Schools in Bacon County, Georgia